The Twelve Chairs is a 1976 four episode musical television film directed by Mark Zakharov based on the 1928 novel of the same name by Ilf and Petrov.

It is the second full length adaptation of the novel in the Soviet Union (the first was directed by Leonid Gaidai) and is the sixth one in the world.

Plot
The film takes place in 1927 from April to October in the Soviet cities of Stargorod, Moscow, Vasyuki, Pyatigorsk, Vladikavkaz, Tbilisi, and Yalta.

The quiet life of registrar Ippolit Matveyevich Vorobyaninov is rocked by the sudden death of his mother-in-law Claudia Ivanovna, who admits that she sewed her diamonds into the seat of one of the twelve chairs belonging to their former living room set in order to hide it from Soviet forces, who had been confiscating treasures from everyone.

Vorobyaninov decides to track down the treasure. Before he can begin his quest, Ippolit Matveyevich meets a young swindler named Ostap Bender who coerces him into agreeing to help in the search in exchange for a percentage of the profit. Unfortunately, the town priest Father Fyodor also learns of Claudia Ivanovna's secret as part of her confession and decides to find the chair himself. Bender dreams of using the profits to move to Rio de Janeiro, which he believes to be the greatest place in the world.

The companions go on the hunt for the chairs across the whole country, encountering many unique and interesting characters, and competing against each other along the way. In the end, they find eleven out of the twelve chairs and return to Moscow without finding the treasure. Somehow, Bender manages to track down the last missing chair and informs Ippolit Matveyevich, whom he has taken to calling Kisa, about this before he goes to sleep. Because they have inspected all the other chairs and found nothing, both know that the treasure is hidden in this last chair. Kisa decides to seize the treasure for himself and kills the sleeping Ostap by cutting his throat with a straight razor. However, Vorobyaninov fails to retrieve the treasure because the Railroad Club caretaker had accidentally discovered the diamonds in the chair and "Comrade Krasilnikov", the club's manager, has already built a new club with the money.

Cast
 Andrei Mironov as Ostap Bender
 Georgy Vitsin as Bezenchuk
 Anatoli Papanov as Vorobyaninov
Rolan Bykov as Father Fyodor
 Aleksandr Abdulov as engineer Schukin
 Tatyana Pelttser as Madame Petukhova
 Lidiya Fedoseyeva-Shukshina as Madame Gritsatsuyeva
 Lyubov Polishchuk as dancer
 Mark Zakharov
 Vsevolod Larionov as Absalom Iznuryonkov
 Vera Orlova as Yelena Stanislavovna Bour
 Eduard Abalov

Themes and analysis
The Twelve Chairs, much like its source material, is a social critique of society, opining on themes such as religion, culture, economic policy, morality and the transformation of Russia under communism. Vorobianinov represents the old guard of Russians of the Russian Empire, while Bender himself is the epitome of the new Russian people under the rule of the Communist Party of the Soviet Union.

References

External links

1976 films
Soviet musical comedy films
Russian musical comedy films
1970s musical comedy films
1976 in the Soviet Union
1970s crime comedy films
1970s Russian-language films
Russian television miniseries
1970s Soviet television series
Studio Ekran films
Ilf and Petrov
Soviet crime comedy films
Russian crime comedy films
Films directed by Mark Zakharov
Films scored by Gennady Gladkov
1976 comedy films